Ecuador is a predominantly Christian country, with adherents of Islam representing a very small minority. Due to secular nature of the Ecuador's constitution, Muslims are free to proselytize and build places of worship in the country. The Pew Research Center estimates that Ecuador has a Muslim population of about 2000, representing 0.011% out of total population of 16,965,000 inhabitants.

The first Muslim settlers in Ecuador were primarily Arabs who emigrated from the Middle East during World War I and thereafter from former territories of the Ottoman Empire. They settled mostly in Quito, Ambato and Guayaquil with smaller communities in Manabí, Los Ríos, and Esmeraldas provinces. Levantine Christians and Muslims created a secular ethnic organisation called Lecla in the 1940s and The Arab Club in the 1980s.  By the mid 1990s, naturalized citizens and native Muslims of Arab extraction were using a private apartment located in Avenue Los Shyris and Eloy Alfaro as a communal prayer venue, especially on Fridays. At a later day the Egyptian Embassy provided another private apartment for the same purposes. The Centro Islámico del Ecuador, founded on October 15, 1994,  was the first Muslim religious organization recognized by the government. However, it was not the first organization to open its doors in this city. A mosque under the name Khaled ibn al-Walid was founded in the year 1991; it conducted its religious rituals in a private apartment.  Religious activities as well as social, cultural and educational activities are conducted according to Sunni Islam. 
The Khaled ibn al Walid mosque nowadays is run by Sheikh Mohamed Mamdouh, and had opened it doors for all Muslims domiciled in Quito.

In Guayaquil, the Centro Islamico Al Hijra was established in 2004 by Juan Saud from Ecuador, Ali Said from Pakistan, and Mazhar Farooq from India.

References

 
Ecuador
Religion in Ecuador